Karasyovka is a rural locality (a village) in Isheyevsky Selsoviet, Ishimbaysky District, Bashkortostan, Russia. The population was 70 as of 2010. There are 8 streets.

Geography 
Karasyovka is located 29 km north of Ishimbay (the district's administrative centre) by road. Urnyak is the nearest rural locality.

References 

Rural localities in Ishimbaysky District